DXBZ (88.5 FM) was a radio station owned and operated by Rizal Memorial Colleges Broadcasting Corporation. Its studios and transmitter were located at Purok 4, Brgy. Sta. Maria, Nabunturan.

History
The station was established in 2015 as YKFM on 107.3 MHz under the management of YK Broadcasting Service of Rep. Manuel "Way Kurat" Zamora. In 2016, the station moved to its new home, the RMCBC-owned 88.5 FM. On July 8, 2020, it was relaunched as ZRadio and became an affiliate station of FMR Philippines, the flagship radio network of the Philippine Collective Media Corporation.

In June 2022, the station went off-the-air permanently due to the presence of XFM Mati (operated by Yes2Health Advertising, Inc.), which broadcasts from the neighboring province of Davao Oriental on the same frequency. As a result, PCMC purchased ZRadio's non-license assets (such as programming and on-air personalities) and transferred to 96.7 FM.

References

External links
Facebook Page

Radio stations in Davao del Norte
Radio stations established in 2015